Archana Mahanta (Assamese: অৰ্চনা মহন্ত) (18 March 1949 – 27 August 2020) was a renowned folk singer from Assam, India. Archana Mahanta and her late husband Khagen Mahanta had an enormous contribution in popularising and preserving Assamese folk music. The musical couple often performed together, singing many duet hits.

Personal life
Archana Mahanta was the wife of Assamese folk singer Khagen Mahanta and the mother of popular singer Papon.

Work
Some famous songs of Archana-Khagen duo include (in Assamese):
 Bhor Duporiya
 A Phool Pah Halichha Jalichha
 Bhal Lagi Jai O
 Chateo Matile
 Junti Ulale Torati Ulabo

Death
Archana Mahanta died on 27 August 2020. She was suffering from diabetes, high blood pressure, and Parkinson's disease.

References

Singers from Assam
Indian women folk singers
Assamese playback singers
2020 deaths
1949 births
20th-century Indian singers
20th-century Indian women